"Love Me Right" is a song by South Korean–Chinese boy band Exo, released on June 3, 2015, for the repackaged edition of their second studio album Love Me Right. It was released in Korean and Chinese versions by their label SM Entertainment. A Japanese version of the song, titled "Love Me Right ~romantic universe~", was released as Exo's debut single in Japan by Avex Trax on November 4, 2015.

Release and promotion
Following member Tao's withdrawal from group activities, Exo continued with the nine-member line-up by releasing a repackaged edition of their second studio album Exodus. "Love Me Right" served as the titular single and was released together with its music videos on June 3, 2015. The group began performing the song on South Korean TV music shows on June 4, 2015. They also added the song to the setlist of their second headlining tour The Exo'luxion starting from the Taipei show on June 12, 2015.

Reception
"Love Me Right" topped South Korea's Gaon Digital Chart, becoming Exo's second domestic number one, and reached number 3 on the Billboard World Digital Songs chart. The song went on to win first place 11 times in total on South Korean music TV shows. Dazed magazine named it the 3rd best K-pop track of 2015.

Japanese version 
On August 30, 2015, Exo was announced to be releasing their debut single in Japan on November 4. The single was later revealed to be a Japanese version of "Love Me Right", re-titled "Love Me Right (Romantic Universe)". On the day of its release, the single sold a total of 147,000 copies and reached the top of the Oricon chart, becoming the best selling debut single in Japan by a Korean artist of all time. The single was later released in South Korea on November 18, 2015.

Track listing

Charts

Weekly charts

Year-end charts

Sales

Certifications

Awards and nominations

Music program awards

Release history

References

External links

Exo songs
2015 songs
2015 singles
Korean-language songs
Japanese-language songs
SM Entertainment singles
Avex Trax singles